Stanisław Krzesiński (born 3 February 1950 in Białobrzegi) is a Polish former wrestler who competed in the 1972 Summer Olympics and in the 1976 Summer Olympics.

References

External links
 

1950 births
Living people
Olympic wrestlers of Poland
Wrestlers at the 1972 Summer Olympics
Wrestlers at the 1976 Summer Olympics
Polish male sport wrestlers
People from Białobrzegi County
Sportspeople from Masovian Voivodeship